Peter Spencer Lammons Jr. (October 20, 1943 – April 29, 2021) was an American professional football player who was a tight end for the American Football League (AFL)'s New York Jets, winning the AFL Championship with them in 1968, and playing in their victory over the National Football League (NFL) champion Baltimore Colts in the third AFL-NFL World Championship game. He also played for the NFL's Green Bay Packers.

As a high school freshman, Lammons played briefly under NFL coach Bum Phillips during his tenure as head coach at Jacksonville High School in Jacksonville, Texas. They met again briefly in January 1968 on the sidelines of the 1967 AFL All Star Game.  Lammons, playing in his first and only All Star Game, greeted Phillips, who was an assistant with the San Diego Chargers organization, after the game with a question: "Bum, does this mean I can claim you as a coach?" Phillips allegedly responded "You can claim me as your'n if I can claim you as mine, Pete!"

Lammons played end for Darrell Royal's 1963 Texas Longhorns football team.

Lammons died on April 29, 2021, when he fell from a boat during a Major League Fishing tournament on the Sam Rayburn Reservoir in Texas. He was 77 years old.

See also
List of American Football League players

References

External links
 Pete Lammons (statistics & history) – Pro-Football-Reference.com.
 Vecsey, George. "Texas-Alabama: Rematch 45 Years in the Making," The New York Times, Wednesday, January 6, 2010.

1943 births
2021 deaths
People from Crockett, Texas
Players of American football from Texas
American football tight ends
Texas Longhorns football players
American Football League All-Star players
New York Jets players
Green Bay Packers players
People from Jacksonville, Texas
American Football League players
Deaths by drowning in the United States
Accidental deaths in Texas